Elliot Arthur McAdam  (born 1951) is a former Australian politician. He was the Labor Party (ALP) member for Barkly in the Northern Territory Legislative Assembly from 2001 to 2008.

|}

Born in Elliott, Northern Territory, McAdam was the general manager of the Julalikari Aboriginal Council before entering the Assembly. First elected in 2001, he was re-elected in 2005 and was appointed Minister for Local Government and Housing. His portfolio was extended to include Central Australia, Corporate and Information Services and Communications in September 2006. He resigned from the ministry in 2008 after one of his local government reorganisation initiatives was abandoned by the Henderson Government. He retired in 2008.

McAdam unsuccessfully contested Barkly as an independent at the 2016 election, losing to his successor Gerry McCarthy.

References

1951 births
Living people
Members of the Northern Territory Legislative Assembly
Indigenous Australian politicians
Australian Labor Party members of the Northern Territory Legislative Assembly
Members of the Order of Australia
21st-century Australian politicians